Pitcairnia multiramosa is a plant species in the genus Pitcairnia. This species is endemic to Bolivia.

References

multiramosa
Flora of Bolivia